Tommy Haas was the defending champion but lost to Martin Kližan in the semifinals.
Kližan went on to win the title, defeating Fabio Fognini in the final, 2–6, 6–1, 6–2.

Seeds
The top four seeds receive a bye into the second round. 

 Fabio Fognini (final)
 Tommy Haas (semifinals)
 Mikhail Youzhny (second round)
 Gaël Monfils (withdrew)
 Philipp Kohlschreiber (first round)
 Feliciano López (first round)
 Andreas Seppi (quarterfinals)
 Ivan Dodig (first round)

Draw

Finals

Top half

Bottom half

Qualifying

Seeds

 Jan-Lennard Struff (qualified)
 Albert Ramos (qualified)
 Martin Kližan (qualified)
 Thomaz Bellucci (qualified)
 Michael Berrer (qualifying competition, lucky loser)
 Ričardas Berankis (qualifying competition, lucky loser)
 Norbert Gomboš (qualifying competition)
 Ruben Bemelmans (qualifying competition)

Qualifiers

  Jan-Lennard Struff
  Albert Ramos
  Martin Kližan
  Thomaz Bellucci

Lucky losers

  Michael Berrer
  Ričardas Berankis

Qualifying draw

First qualifier

Second qualifier

Third qualifier

Fourth qualifier

References
 Main Draw
 Qualifying Draw

2014 ATP World Tour
Singles